The River Don is a  long tributary of the River Tyne in Tyne and Wear, North East England.

It rises near Springwell and flows east for about 6 km, then turns north. It flows under the Jarrow Bridge and meets the river Tyne at Jarrow. For much of its length in the upper section, it is the boundary between Gateshead and Sunderland.

See also
List of rivers of England

References

Don